Chauncey Thomas (August 13, 1813 in Damascus, Wayne County, Pennsylvania – October 5, 1882 in Shohola Glen, Pike County, Pennsylvania), was one of eleven children born to mill owner and entrepreneur Moses Thomas and his wife, Rebecca Monington.  On his father's side of the family, his grandfather Moses Thomas had been killed by Indians near Narrowsburg during the French and Indian War.  On his maternal side, the Monington family of Philadelphia had come to the Delaware valley from Gloucester, England in the early 18th century.

He is probably best known as the owner of the four of erstwhile Barryville–Shohola Bridges over the Delaware River, and as the father of Rear Admiral and Commander in Chief of the Pacific Fleet, Chauncey Thomas Jr., USN.

References

1813 births
1882 deaths
Bridge companies
Farmers from Pennsylvania
American manufacturing businesspeople
People from Wayne County, Pennsylvania
Businesspeople from Pennsylvania